Periploca gleditschiaeella is a moth in the family Cosmopterigidae. It was described by Vactor Tousey Chambers in 1876. It is found in North America, where it has been recorded from Maryland, Illinois, Ohio and Kentucky.

The larvae feed on Gleditschia triacanthos.

References

Arctiidae genus list at Butterflies and Moths of the World of the Natural History Museum

Moths described in 1876
Chrysopeleiinae
Moths of North America